Chryse may refer to:

Ancient Greece and Rome
 Chryse (mythology), several figures in Greek mythology
 Chryse (ancient Greek placename), various places in ancient Greek geography
 Chryse, Greek name for Aurea of Ostia (died mid-3rd century), Christian martyr and saint in the Roman Empire

Other uses
 Chryse Planitia, a plain on Mars
 Chryse, a fictional planet in the novel The Legend That Was Earth
 Chryse Autonomous Region, a city on Mars in the anime Mobile Suit Gundam: Iron-Blooded Orphans

See  also
 Chryses, father of Chryseis
 Chryses (mythology), various mythological figures named Chryses